Information & Culture is an academic journal devoted to the study of the history of information, and any topic that would fall under the purview of the modern interdisciplinary schools of information creation, organization, preservation, or utilization. In addition, the Journal honors its 50+ year heritage by continuing to publish in the areas of archival, museum, conservation, and library history as well. It is edited at the University of Texas at Austin School of Information

Established in 1966 as The Journal of Library History, the journal was edited and published at Florida State University  School of Library Science until it moved to the University of Texas at Austin in 1976. It was briefly known as Journal of Library History, Philosophy, and Comparative Librarianship before returning to Journal of Library History. In 1988, the title was changed to Libraries & Culture, and changed again to Libraries and the Cultural Record in 2006. In 2012, the journal assumed its present title, Information & Culture: A Journal of History.

The journal is published three times a year  by the University of Texas Press and is edited by Ciaran B. Trace (University of Texas at Austin School of Information) and Andrew Dillon (University of Texas at Austin School of Information). It is indexed in America: History and Life, Arts and Humanities Citation Index, Book Review Index, Bulletin des Bibliothèques de France, Historical Abstracts,  Journal of American History, Library and Information Science Abstracts, Library Literature, MLA International Bibliography, and Social Sciences Citation Index.

External links
 
 Information & Culture submission guidelines
 Information & Culture at Project MUSE
 Purchase a subscription to Information & Culture 

Information science journals
Triannual journals
Publications established in 1966
English-language journals
University of Texas Press academic journals